Transair Georgia was an airline based in Georgia.

Incidents 
In late-September 1993, three Transair Georgia aircraft were destroyed by Abkhazian rebels over the course of three days, leaving a total of 136 people dead.  The first aircraft (a Tu-134) went down in the Black Sea whilst on approach to Sukhumi Dranda Airport, the second (a Tu-154, reportedly carrying Georgian troops) went down on the runway at the airport, and the third (another Tu-134) was attacked on the ground with mortar/artillery fire.

Fleet
The Transair Georgia fleet included the following aircraft:
Tupolev 134
Tupolev 154

External links

References

 
Defunct airlines of Georgia (country)